Robert, Rob or Bob Haworth may refer to:

 Robert Haworth (footballer) (1879–?), footballer who played for Blackburn Rovers and Fulham in the 1900s
 Robert Haworth (politician) (1801–1875), New South Wales colonial politician
 Bob Haworth (1897–1962), footballer who played for Bolton Wanderers in three FA Cup Finals in the 1920s
 Rob Haworth (born 1975), footballer who played for Fulham in the 1990s
 Robert Downs Haworth (1898–1990), English chemist